Mayré Andrea de los Ángeles Martínez Blanco (Born November 28 in Caracas, Venezuela), is a Latin pop singer, songwriter. She rose to popularity in Latin America after winning the first season of the reality show Latin American Idol. In her native country, Venezuela, she was a contestant in Radio Caracas Television's reality show Fama, Sudor y Lágrimas 2006, where she came in fifth place, because she decided to back out to join the cast of Latin American Idol. She's the oldest contestant ever to win Latin American Idol prior to being the first winner.

Career 
Martínez is a professional singer, singing teacher, and vocal coach.  She created a technique named after herself.  She started her singing studies in 1983, with many private teachers coming from all over the world.  She studied music in the conservatory "Lino Gallardo" and keyboard in the "Roland Learning Center".  She started singing professionally in 1994, performing in countless productions and television advertisings of well-known brands such as Barbie, Ford, and Fundición Pacifico, among others. At present, she is participating in more advertising campaigns, the most recent being TOMI TIPI – some of them made in her own studio.

In 1998, she was invited by Ricardo Montaner, to sing in the chorus, during his tour "Es Así" (It's in this way). Between 1999 and 2001 she entered in several concerts along with the musical producer and guitarist Iván Weinreb, around Venezuela, and internationally.  In 2000, they won an award as International talent by the "Festival de la Canción Latinoamericana" (Festival of Latino-American Song) in California for the song composed by Martínez and Weinberg, titled "Con Nadie Más" (With No One Else). In 2001, Martínez and Weinberg decided to found the "Academia El Arte de Cantar" (The Art of Singing Academy).

At the end of 2004 the International Association of Musical Education included the Academy on their related organizations' directory, recognizing it as the best singing academy in Venezuela. Since 2002, Martínez has carried out every year the Mayré Martínez Singing Festival, a concert where her students perform for their family and friends.

On the night of October 26, 2006, she won the first place on the Idol franchise's new show Latin American Idol, beating out approximately 25,000 people who showed up in different cities throughout South America. After several ups and downs she managed to record her first studio album in early 2007; Soy Mi Destino was released in Mexico in May 2007, and in Venezuela in August 2007; it was a compilation album with the studio version of the songs she'd sung in Latin American Idol, and it also included a DVD with the live performances from the show.

On November 9, 2008, Martínez released a second single from her upcoming album, "Dame 3"; the single was also released with a music video.

In 2019, she participated on Telemundo's La_Voz_(U.S._season_1) and was declared the runner-up.

Latin American Idol

Performances/Results

Discography

Albums
Soy Mi Destino (2007)
La Reina de la Noche (2009)
My Black & Blanco (2015)

Singles
Soy Mi Destino (2007)
Corazón Espinado (2007)
La Reina de la Noche (2008)
 Dame 3 (2008)
 Hay Una Voz (2009)
 Mírame (2009)
 Junto a Mí (2010)

References

External links

Unofficial Fansite
 Fansite

Living people
Singers from Caracas
Latin American Idol participants
Idols (TV series) winners
21st-century Venezuelan women singers
Year of birth missing (living people)